The 1948 Washington State Cougars football team was an American football team that represented Washington State College during the 1948 college football season. Fourth-year head coach Phil Sarboe led the team to a 4–3–1 mark in the Pacific Coast Conference (PCC) and 4–5–1 overall.

The Cougars' had four home games on campus in Pullman at Rogers Field, with the season finale in Tacoma.

Schedule

References

External links
 Game program: Stanford at WSC – October 2, 1948
 Game program: Washington at WSC – October 16, 1948
 Game program: Idaho at WSC – October 30, 1948
 Game program: Oregon State at WSC – November 6, 1949
 Game program: Penn State vs. WSC at Tacoma – November 27, 1948

Washington State
Washington State Cougars football seasons
Washington State Cougars football